Nick Augusto (born August 4, 1986) is an American drummer, best known as the former drummer of heavy metal band Trivium, in which he played from 2009 until 2014. He was the former touring drummer for Light the Torch from 2016 to 2017.

Career 

Augusto was the drummer for the Floridian grindcore band Maruta, as well as Metal Militia, in which he played with Trivium bassist Paolo Gregoletto whom he had known since kindergarten. He was a part of Trivium technical crew being responsible for drums. After the first leg of "Into The Mouth Of Hell We Tour", which was the band's first domestic tour as a headliner, the drummer and founding member Travis Smith went on indefinite hiatus. Augusto was offered to fill-in for him, as the band praised his speedy approach to performing its songs. He played his first show with Trivium on October 29, 2009 at The Masquerade in Atlanta. The band finished the second leg of the tour on December 12, 2009 playing a hometown show in Orlando, still with Augusto on drums.

On February 4, 2010, shortly before the upcoming Asian tour, Augusto was introduced as the new official member of Trivium, as Travis Smith again refused to join the band for live performances. Around the same time two new songs, "Shattering the Skies Above" and Sepultura cover "Slave New World", were released, both featuring Augusto. Since then he recorded two studio albums with the band and appeared in numerous music videos.

On May 3, 2014 he played Carolina Rebellion festival show which turned out to be his last with Trivium. Four days later it was announced that band had parted ways with Augusto whilst travelling on their tour bus in the midst of their current Vengeance Falls album tour due to "off-stage differences".

In October 2014, Augusto announced his new project named Corrosion and revealed the plans of recording an EP with the producer Jason Suecof and Daniel Bergstrand .

In May 2016-January 2017 Augusto played drums on tour for the band Light the Torch.

Equipment 
Nick uses Pearl and DW bass drum pedals. He also uses Pro-Mark drumsticks (Millennium II American Hickory 5B with wood tip).

Discography 
 Implosive Disgorgence – Chapters EP
 Entropy - "Protean"
 Infernaeon – A Symphony of Suffering (prosthetic records)
 Entropy - "This Tide As Manifest Destiny" EP 
 Maruta- Demonstration
 Maruta – In Narcosis (willowtip records)
 Maruta - this comp kills fascists (relapse records)
 Ends Of The Earth – Rebirth EP
 Corrosion - EP (maskina records)

With Trivium:

 Shattering the Skies Above (single) (2010)
 Slave New World (Sepultura cover) (2010)
 In Waves (2011)
 Vengeance Falls (2013)

References 

1986 births
American heavy metal drummers
21st-century American drummers
American people of Italian descent
Living people
Trivium (band) members